Delarbrea is a genus of plants in family Myodocarpaceae, which contains only one other genus, Myodocarpus.

Species
Species include:
Delarbrea balansae (Baill.) Lowry & G.M.Plunkett
Delarbrea collina Vieill.
Delarbrea harmsii R.Vig.
Delarbrea longicarpa R.Vig.
Delarbrea michieana (F.Muell.) F.Muell.
Delarbrea montana R.Vig.
Delarbrea paradoxa Vieill.

References

Apiales genera
Myodocarpaceae